Glaucus is a sculpture by the French artist Auguste Rodin, first conceived in 1886 as a representation of the mythological figure Glaucus, son of Poseidon. Originally made in plaster, bronze casts of it are now in the Brooklyn Museum and the Museo Soumaya.

Inspiration
It was one of many studies arising from Rodin's reading of Ovid's Metamorphoses, here drawing on Book XIV, 1-74. It adds a female figure to the male figure from Seated Old Man in order to represent the myth of Glaucus and Scylla, meaning that it departs from the original myth in that both figures have human not monstrous legs. According to Bartlett, the work suggests that Glaucus is instead turning into a tree.

Versions

There is a variant of it shows a woman leaning her head to the man's chest and so in known as The Confidence or Confiding. It also appears twice on Rodin's The Gates of Hell, both times with the figure resting on his back.

See also
List of sculptures by Auguste Rodin

Notes

References

External links

Sculptures by Auguste Rodin
1886 sculptures
Sculptures of the Museo Soumaya
Plaster sculptures
Bronze sculptures
Sculptures based on Metamorphoses
Sculptures of Greek gods